The 2015 Seguros Bolívar Open Barranquilla was a professional tennis tournament played on clay courts. It was the fourth edition of the tournament which was part of the 2015 ATP Challenger Tour. It took place in Barranquilla, Colombia between 7 and 13 September 2015.

Singles main-draw entrants

Seeds

Other entrants
The following players received wildcards into the singles main draw:
  Borna Ćorić
  Taro Daniel
  José Daniel Bendeck
  Marcel Granollers

The following players received entry from the qualifying draw:
  Mauricio Echazú 
  Daniel Elahi Galán
  Felipe Mantilla 
  Ruan Roelofse

Doubles main-draw entrants

Seeds

Other entrants
The following pairs received wildcards into the doubles main draw:
  Felipe Escobar /  Felipe Mantilla
  José Daniel Bendeck /  Alejandro Gómez
  Gregorio Cordonnier /  Juan Sebastián Gómez

Champions

Singles

 Borna Ćorić def.  Rogério Dutra Silva 6–4, 6–1

Doubles

 Marcelo Arévalo /  Sergio Galdós def.  Duilio Beretta /  Mauricio Echazú 6–1, 6–4

External links
Official Website

Seguros Bolivar Open Barranquilla
Seguros Bolívar Open Barranquilla
2015 in Colombian tennis